Hesha Station is a station on Line 6 of the Guangzhou Metro. It is located under Yuxian Road on the island of Datansha in the Liwan District of Guangzhou. It started operation on 28December 2013.

Station layout

Exits

References

Railway stations in China opened in 2013
Guangzhou Metro stations in Liwan District